The Monroe and Walton Mills Historic District in Monroe, Georgia is a  historic district which was listed on the National Register of Historic Places in 1983.  The listing included 236 contributing buildings.

It is an industrial district, including four types of uses:  mill buildings, mill houses, support buildings, and an area of large houses.

It would eventually have 5,000 spindles.

The Walton Cotton Mill building was built during 1900–01.

References

Historic districts on the National Register of Historic Places in Georgia (U.S. state)
National Register of Historic Places in Walton County, Georgia